Nalambalam is a set of four Hindu temples in Kerala. In Malayalam, Nalu means "four" and Ambalam means "temple". These are the temples for the Rama and his brothers of Ramayana. There are around five sets of Nalambalams in Kerala, the most famous among them being the four temples located in Thrissur and Ernakulam districts, namely Thriprayar Sree Rama Temple, Koodalmanikyam Bharatha Temple, Moozhikkulam Lakshmana Temple and Payyammal Shathrughna Temple.

Nalambalam Yatra
Nalambalam Yatra begins from the Rama temple in Triprayar and ends up at Shatrughna Temple in Payyammal. It is customary to visit the four temples in the order Rama, Bharata, Lakshmana and Shatrughna respectively. A pilgrimage to these temples on a single day during the holy month of Karkkidakam believed to shower blessings and ensure prosperity. Starting from Thriprayar reaching Payammel through Koodalmanikyam and Moozhikulam, ending back at Thriprayar is the custom of pilgrimage.

Thriprayar Sreerama Temple 
Thriprayar Temple houses a 6 ft tall idol of the Lord, holding Shankha, Sudarsanachakra, Stick and Garland, in a very ferocious form facing east. He is seen in standing posture. Vedi Vazhipadu and Meenoottu are the main offerings. The temple is under the control of Cochin Devaswom Board, an autonomous body.

This temple observes Sethubandhanam 'in every year in "Thiruvonam" day of Malayalam month "Kanni". The only place in earth where Sethubandhanam occurs every year, in memory of those in Ramayana, is at Sree Raman Chira Chemmappilly. Chemmappilly is a nearby place to Thriprayar, two kilometres apart from the temple. Whole arrangements are done by Thriprayar Devaswam. The temple is closed early after performing "Deeparadhana" and "Athazhapooja" (Evening and night poojas). At a time the early closing of Sreeramaswamy Temple is done only in two occasions in a year. One is for "Sreeraman chirakettu" (i.e., .Sethubandhanam) and another is "Arattupuzha Devamela".

Thriprayar is in the middle of Guruvayoor – Kodungallore route . Those who want to come via Trichur should reach Cherpu and proceed west wards to reach the east nada of the temple . Here is the famous Rama temple. This is the first temple to visit as part of Nalambalam Pilgrimage. Darshan is possible from 3am – 12.30pm and 5pm to 8:30pm . Meenuttu and Vedi are important Vazipadu.

Koodalmanikyam Temple, Irinjalakuda 
Koodalmanikyam Temple is one among the rare temples in India dedicated to the worship of Bharata, the second brother of Rama. Koodalmanikyam Temple houses another 6 ft tall idol of the Lord, seen in ferocious form, facing east, in standing posture holding the same things as seen at Triprayar. This is one of the rare temples where only one idol is there. The temple has a private devaswom.

This is a unique Vaishnava Temple and the second temple to visit. From Triprayar proceed in the Kodungallore route and divert from Edamuttam or Moonnupeedika.  Irinjalakuda is about 20 km away from Triprayar.  Darshan is possible from 3am – 12 noon, and 5pm to 8pm . Important Vazhipatus are Thamaramala, Brinjal Nivedyam, Vedi, Gheelamp, Meeunttu.

Moozhikkulam Sree Lakshmana Perumal Temple 
Thirumoozhikkulam Lakshmana Perumal Temple is the only temple in Ernakulam District, and the only one among the four temples, which belong to the 108 Divya Desams, praised by Alvars. The temple houses another 6 ft tall idol, similar to the idol at Triprayar, holding Shankha, Sudarsana chakra, Mace and Lotus, in standing posture, facing east.

Moozhikkulam Temple is the third temple to visit and is dedicated to Lakshmana. This is in Ernakulam District near to famous Annamanada Mahadeva temple proceed alongs Vellankallore in Irinjalakuda route to Kodungallore and reach Mala, Annamanada and then Muzhikkulam . Darshan is possible from 4 to 11.00 and 5 to 8 .

Payammal Sree Shathruknha swaamee Temple 
Payammal Sree Shathruknha swaamee Temple is the smallest temple, having the smallest idol, also similar to that at Triprayar. This is the last temple to visit.  Reach Vellangallore and proceed west wards 4 km to reach Aripalam. Take right turn and reach the temple. Important Vazhipadu is Sudarshanan dedication. Darshan time is 5:00 AM to 10:30 AM and 5:30 PM to 7:30 PM. During the month of Karkidakam alone the darshan timings are changed to 5:00 AM to 1:30 PM and 4:30 PM to 8:00 PM.

How to reach 

Thriprayar

By Road: Triprayar is freely accessible by road from Thrissur(25 km) and Guruvayoor.(24)
By Rail: Thrissur.(25) Guruvayoor.(24)
ByAir: Kochi 60 km.

Irinjalakuda

By Road: Irinjalakuda is freely accessible by road from Thrissur(22 km)
By Rail:Irinjalakuda( 9 km)
By Air: Kochi 46 km

Moozhikulam

By Road:Near Angamaly in Ernakulam district. The temple is around 50 km south of Thrissur town.
By Rail: Angamali-8.7 km
By Air: Kochi15km

Payammel

By Road: 8 km away from Irinjalakuda, 4 km away from Mathilakm. 
By Rail: Irinjalakuda 15 km
By Air: Kochi 45 km

Map Directions

Google Maps Direction: https://goo.gl/maps/hdbziqdVHA52

See also
Ramapuram in Kottayam district, Kerala is another place where temples of all four brothers are situated. The four temples of central Kerala, thronged by Hindu devotees during the holy month of Karkitakam are centred round Ramapuram, within a distance of three kilometres. They are Ramapuram Sree Ramaswamy Temple, Koodappulam Sree Lakshmanaswamy Temple, Amanakara Sree Bharathaswamy Temple and Methiri Sree Sathrughnaswamy Temple. These temples together are called the Nalambalam.

The deities here are the four sons of King Dasaratha of Ramayana. Lord Ram, the eldest of them is the seventh avatar (incarnation) of Lord Vishnu, who is the Supreme God of the Hindus. Bharata, second amongst them, is the avatar of the Panchajanya (Conch held by Vishnu) .Lakshmana is the avatar of the Adisesha, the serpent of infinite measures and on whom Lord Vishnu sleeps in the Ocean of Milk. Shatrughna (the One who is destroyer of enemies) is the twin brother to Lakshamana and the youngest .He is the avatar of the Sudarshana chakra held by Lord Vishnu.

Visiting nalambalam is considered to be a sacred event during the Malayalam month Karkidakam. Nalambalam consists of temples of brothers Sri Rama, Bharatha, Lakshmana & Sathrughnan.

Devotees can get down at main bus stop of Ramapuram and hire a taxi/ autorickshaw to visit all these age old temples. Karkkidaka is the prime month suitable for Nalambala darsanam. For more details please visit www.nalambalam.org

Devotees can book offerings from anywhere in the world to your favorite deity.

See also
 Temples of Kerala

4 Set of Nalambalams in Kerala http://www.vaikhari.org/nalambalams.html

http://www.nalambalam.org/index.html

References

Hindu temples in Thrissur district
Divya Desams